Gravale at , is the 79th–highest peak in Ireland on the Arderin scale, and the 98th–highest peak on the Vandeleur-Lynam scale. Gravale is in the middle sector of the Wicklow Mountains range, in Wicklow, Ireland. Gravale sits on a north-east to south-west "boggy ridge" that forms the "central spine" of the whole range, which runs from the Sally Gap, to Carrigvore , to Gravale, and after a col to Duff Hill , which is part of the larger massif of Mullaghcleevaun .

Naming
According to Irish academic Paul Tempan, the historian Eoin MacNeill, writing in the Journal of the Royal Society of Antiquaries of Ireland (JRSAI), thought that the Irish name "Drobeóil", as listed in the Metrical Dinsenchas, had survived the mountain name "Gravale". Tempan also notes that historical maps of the estates in which Gravale lies suggest that the col between Gravale and Duff Hill was known as "Lavarna" or "Lavarnia", from the Irish "Leath-Bhearna", meaning "half-gap", and that this was likely a difficult trail from the Blessington lakes area to Lough Dan.

Bibliography

See also
Wicklow Way
Wicklow Mountains
Lists of mountains in Ireland
List of mountains of the British Isles by height
List of Hewitt mountains in England, Wales and Ireland

References

External links
MountainViews: The Irish Mountain Website, Gravale
MountainViews: Irish Online Mountain Database
The Database of British and Irish Hills , the largest database of British Isles mountains ("DoBIH")
Hill Bagging UK & Ireland, the searchable interface for the DoBIH

Mountains and hills of County Wicklow
Hewitts of Ireland
Mountains under 1000 metres